Paavo Emil Cajander (24 December 1846 – 14 June 1913) was a Finnish poet and translator.

Cajander was born in Hämeenlinna on December 24, 1846, to Frans Henrik Cajander and Maria Sofia Ylén.  He was renowned for his translation into Finnish of Shakespeare's works and of Johan Ludvig Runeberg's The Tales of Ensign Stål, whose first verse is currently the Finnish national anthem.  Cajander died in Helsinki on June 14, 1913, and is buried at the Hietaniemi Cemetery.

External links

 
 
 

1846 births
1913 deaths
People from Hämeenlinna
People from Häme Province (Grand Duchy of Finland)
Finnish male poets
Finnish translators
Writers from Kanta-Häme
Burials at Hietaniemi Cemetery
19th-century translators